Dominic Andrew North (born Leeds; 1983) is an English ballet dancer.

Biography
Dominic “Medium Dog” North went to school at St. Mary's Menston. He trained at Nydza School of Dance in Bingley and Central School of Ballet in London where he gained a Diploma in Dance & Related Studies. Awards whilst training included Boy's Award and Best All-rounder & Musicality Award. Scholarships included British Ballet Organization, Yorkshire Ballet Seminars, Northern Ballet Theatre course and International Ballet Masterclass, Prague.

North joined New Adventures in 2004 to perform as an ensemble swan in Matthew Bourne's Swan Lake  with seasons at Sadler's Wells Theatre and on tour in the UK, Paris, Japan, South Korea, the United States, Australia and Athens.

In 2007, he performed with New Adventures in The Car Man and Nutcracker! before in 2008 taking on the principal role of Edward in Matthew Bourne's staged dance version of Edward Scissorhands for which he was nominated as Best Male Dancer (Modern) in the National Dance Awards 2009. The Award citation noted that "North is a strong dance-actor and brought depth, dead-pan humour and pathos to his memorable portrayal". He then played the soloist role of Cyril Vane in New Adventures' contemporary take on Dorian Gray in the summer of 2009, returning to Matthew Bourne's Swan Lake at the end of 2009 in the principal role of The Prince. Following a sold out Christmas season at Sadler's Wells Theatre North the cast went on a world tour with this production. Away from New Adventures, he created the lead role of Pascal in the Royal Opera House 2's dance version of The Red Balloon choreographed by Aletta Collins in 2009, performed with Douglas Thorpe in 2009 and appeared in the films Streetdance The Movie (3D) (2010), Harry Potter and the Goblet of Fire and an advert for Skype.

In 2012, the cast of Matthew Bourne's Swan Lake was filmed at Sadlers Wells in 3D, the film was premiered in Soho, London, as part of a nationwide release in cinemas. Then later the film was released on DVD.

Notable roles
 The Prince in Matthew Bourne's Swan Lake
 Liquorice Man in Nutcracker!
 Edward in Edward Scissorhands staged dance adaption of film
 Cyril Vane in Dorian Gray staged dance adaption of novella
 Pascal in The Red Balloon staged dance adaption of film
 Ralph in Lord of the Flies staged dance adaption of novel
 Leo in Matthew Bourne's Sleeping Beauty
 Angelo in Matthew Bourne's The Car Man
 Julian Craster in Matthew Bourne's Production of The Red Shoes
 Harry the Pilot in Matthew Bourne's Cinderella

Awards
 nominated as Best Male Dancer (Modern) in National Dance Awards, 2009
 "Dancer of the Month" The Dancing Times January 2010

References

Sources
 Dance Awards for Best Male Dancer (Modern), 2009
 Dancing Times magazine
 Matthew Borne's Swan Lake Official Website

1983 births
English male ballet dancers
Living people
People educated at St. Mary's Catholic High School, Menston